Peter Fitzgerald (born 27 October 1953) is an Australian former sprinter who competed in the 1976 Summer Olympics.

References

1953 births
Living people
Australian male sprinters
Olympic athletes of Australia
Athletes (track and field) at the 1976 Summer Olympics